Hermann Hochleitner (17 October 1925 – 26 May 2010) was an Austrian footballer. He competed in the men's tournament at the 1952 Summer Olympics.

References

External links
 
 

1925 births
2010 deaths
Austrian footballers
Austria international footballers
Olympic footballers of Austria
Footballers at the 1952 Summer Olympics
Footballers from Salzburg
Association football forwards
FC Red Bull Salzburg players